The Max Planck Institute for Security and Privacy (MPI-SP) is a computer science research institute founded in May 2019 and located in Bochum, Germany. The institute mission is to study and develop the technical foundations and interdisciplinary aspects of cyber security and privacy.

The institute is one of six researching computer science as a part of the Max-Planck-Gesellschaft. The founding directors are Gilles Barthe and Christof Paar with the intention to recruit further tenure-track faculty each year.

References

External links 
 Max Planck Institute for Security and Privacy
 Max-Planck-Gesellschaft Homepage

Computer science institutes in Germany
Security And Privacy